High Speed is a pinball game designed by Steve Ritchie and released by Williams Electronics in 1986. It is based on Ritchie's real-life police chase inside a 1979 Porsche 928.

A sequel was released 1992 called The Getaway: High Speed II.

Gameplay 
The main object of the game is to turn the main stoplight (located on the ramp) from green to yellow to red by hitting the nine stoplight targets (three of each color). Shooting the ball up the ramp or into the eject hole (saucer) also spots a stoplight target. Once all nine have been lit, the objective is to shoot the ball up the ramp again, thus "running the red light," and starting the police chase mode.

To escape the police, the player can either shoot the ball up the ramp again (a Getaway) or by lighting all nine stoplight targets again and then shooting the eject hole (an Escape), starting multi-ball. Once multi-ball begins, all targets, spinners, and bumper shots increase the Hideout Jackpot (which carries over from game to game until won, and begins at 250,000 points, growing to a maximum of 2 million points). To win the jackpot, the player must shoot the ramp once again.

Another main feature of the game is the Freeways; one is located in each of the left and right orbits, denoted by spinners (and a third spinner leads to the eject hole).  Shooting either one of the two inlanes or making a loop around one of the orbits lights a Freeway, and the player then has 5 seconds to shoot the lit orbit again, scoring the Freeway value, increasing from 25,000 to 100,000 points, and eventually lighting an extra ball (which can be collected by shooting the eject hole).

Shooting the ball up the ramp also increases the bonus multiplier from 2X up to 5X, any additional shots beyond 5X activate the BONUS HELD.

Once the jackpot has been won, the player can then attempt to light all nine stoplight targets again (as long as multi-ball is still going), and doing so lights a special, which can be collected if the ball drains in the correct outlane.

Extra balls will be given, but once five of them are earned in a game, a score award is added per one earned thereafter.

Production
During its design, High Speed was jokingly called "High Cost" by some rival Williams designers due to its then-high production cost.  The advances in the mechanical design that went into High Speed, coupled with the machine's popularity, led to many machines being kept in service much longer than was previously the norm.  The play surfaces of the machine were not initially given as much attention, leading to many High Speed machines seeing service to this day in extremely worn condition.  Williams rapidly addressed this issue by making mylar playfield covers available and later adding hard clear paint coats to their playfields. Canadian specialist Classic Playfield Reproductions produced an officially licensed High Speed 13-color Reproduction Playfield, which shipped as limited edition in 2014.

Reception
High Speed was one of the games (along with 1986's Pin*Bot and 1984's Space Shuttle) that helped revitalize the pinball industry, which had become stagnant due in part to the video game crash of 1983. High Speed sold 17,080 units.

Pinball designer Pat Lawlor and pinball programmer Dwight Sullivan stated that High Speed is one of their favorite games.

Game quotes
 "Okay buddy, Pull over!"
 "504, this is dispatch. He what?"
 "Suspect got away."
 "He got away."
 "Dispatch, this is 504. We're in pursuit, over."
 "Roger 504. Apprehend them."
 "Dispatch this is 504. Suspect ran a red light. Over."
 "Dispatch, this is 504. He got away, over."

Machine messages
 "Light is red."
 "Run red light."
 "You got away."
 "You escaped."
 "You win jackpot."

Digital versions 
A licensed version of this table was released on The Pinball Arcade for multiple platforms. Its successor The Getaway: High Speed II was also released as an additional table for this collection. After , only The Getaway: High Speed II is available.

Rare adapted High Speed into a video game of the same name for the Nintendo Entertainment System. It was published by Tradewest in 1991.

See also
Checkpoint, another pinball machine with racing theme

References

External links
 

1986 pinball machines
Williams pinball machines